The Orchestre symphonique de Mulhouse is a French symphonic orchestra based in Mulhouse, in the Alsace region.  Its principal venue is La Filature.

History
The Orchestre symphonique de Mulhouse has its origins in the small municipal orchestra founded in 1867 in the Alsatian city of Mulhouse. In 1972, it became the Orchestre régional de Mulhouse.  In 1979, the orchestra took the name of the Orchestre symphonique du Rhin and, finally, the Orchestre symphonique de Mulhouse.  The orchestra divides its duties between its symphonic season at La Filature and opera performances at the Opéra national du Rhin (whose services it shares with the Orchestre philharmonique de Strasbourg). 

The orchestra's most recent music director was Jacques Lacombe, from 2018 to 2021.  In June 2022, Christoph Koncz first guest-conducted the orchestra.  In September 2022, the orchestra announced the appointment of Koncz as its next music director, effective September 2023, with an initial contract of 3 years.

Music directors (partial list)
 Paul Capolongo (1975–1985)
 Luca Pfaff (1986–1996)
 Cyril Diederich (1996–2005)
 Daniel Klajner (2005–2011)
 Gwennolé Rufet (acting music and artistic director, 2011–2013)
 Patrick Davin (2013–2018)
 Jacques Lacombe (2018–2021)
 Christoph Koncz (designate, effective 2023)

Discography
 Glanzberg (Holocaust Lieder, Suite Yiddish), Roman Trekel (baritone), Daniel Klajner (conductor)
 French and Italian opera arias (Rossini, Ponchielli, Leoncavallo, Saint-Saëns, Bizet) – Maria Riccarda Wesseling (mezzo-soprano), Victor Dernovski (first violin), Urmas Tammik (cello solo), Daniel Klajner (conductor)
 Chansons de toujours ("Plaisirs d’amour, "Le Temps des cerises", "La chanson des blés d’or", ...) – José van Dam (baritone), Cyril Diederich (conductor)
 Strauss / Sonzogno (Waltzes, polkas and other dances) – Luca Pfaff (conductor)

References

External links
 
 La Filature official website
 

French orchestras
Symphony orchestras
Musical groups established in 1975
Mulhouse
Organizations based in Grand Est